The  Austrian Statistical Society  (Österreichischen Statistischen Gesellschaft) is a national scientific organization. It publishes  the Austrian Journal of Statistics, formerly known as the Österreichische Zeitschrift für Statistik.

Journal
The official journal of the society is the Austrian Journal of Statistics, a quarterly peer-reviewed open access scientific journal published under a Creative Commons Attribution License (CC-BY). It was established in 1972 and covers the use of statistical methods in all kind of theoretical and applied disciplines. Special emphasis is put on methods and results in official statistics.

Editors
The following persons have been editors-in-chief of the journal:
2014–2016 Matthias Templ
2004–2013 Herwig Friedl
2002–2012 Rudolf Dutter

References

External links

1951 establishments in Austria
Statistical societies